Holy Family with the Infant Saint John the Baptist is a c.1522-1523 oil on panel painting by Pontormo, produced early in his career. It now hangs in the Hermitage Museum, which acquired it with countess E. I. Mordvinova's collection. A preparatory drawing survives in the Uffizi's Gabinetto dei Disegni e delle Stampe.

References

1523 paintings
Paintings in the collection of the Hermitage Museum
Paintings by Pontormo
Paintings of the Madonna and Child
Paintings depicting John the Baptist
Paintings of Saint Joseph